Rolled Alloys is a private company headquartered in Temperance, Michigan, in the United States. Rolled Alloys is a supplier in the metal industry for both heat resistant and corrosion resistant alloys. The company has between 201-500 employees throughout the world.  Rolled Alloys' key markets are Aerospace, Chemical Processing, Medical, Oil and Gas, Power Generation, and Thermal Processing. Rolled Alloys Canada also deals in the Pulp / Paper and Mining markets.

Rolled Alloys has expanded through acquisitions of other companies: Harvey Titanium,  Weaver Steel, Super Alloys, SMS London, Clasma Trade, and RA® Materials (formerly Weir Materials and Foundry).

History 
Rolled Alloys was founded in 1953 on the introduction of wrought RA330 alloy as a replacement for cast HT alloy. Prior to 1953, Rolled Alloys was a subsidiary of MISCO - Michigan Steel Casting Company, and wasn't officially incorporated as the new company, until January 1953.

In 2012, Rolled Alloys expanded to Richburg, South Carolina with a new bar facility. Rolled Alloys also built a new facility for their Windsor, CT location.

In 2013, NeoNickel was formed, and is the exclusive representative of Rolled Alloys in Europe.

Locations

United States

 Temperance, Michigan
Fairfield, Ohio
Hawthorne, California
Houston, Texas
 Richburg, South Carolina
Streamwood, Illinois
Tulsa, Oklahoma
 Windsor, Connecticut

Canada

Mississauga, Ontario
Laval, Quebec
Edmonton, Alberta

Asia

 Singapore
 Suzhou, China

Alloy Categories 
Nickel, Duplex Stainless Steel, Super Duplex Stainless Steel, Stainless Steel, Titanium, Cobalt, and Aluminum.

Proprietary Grades 
 RA330 
 RA333
 RA 602 CA
 AL-6XN
 Zeron 100
 RA 253 MA

References

External links

Steel companies of the United States
Steel companies of Canada
Steel companies of China